Eptazocine (Sedapain) is an opioid analgesic which was introduced in Japan by Morishita in 1987. It acts as a mixed κ-opioid receptor agonist and μ-opioid receptor antagonist.

See also
 Benzomorphan

References

Phenols
Analgesics
Opioids